Gunsmoke is the second studio album by Dogbowl and Kramer, released on February 13, 1996, by Shimmy Disc.

Track listing

Personnel 
Adapted from Gunsmoke liner notes.

Musicians
 Dogbowl – vocals, guitar
 Kramer – vocals, slide guitar, bass guitar, drums, percussion, mellotron, piano, flute, tapes, production, engineering, photography

Production and additional personnel
 Jed Rothenberg – assistant engineer
 Steve Watson – assistant engineer

Release history

References

External links 
 Gunsmoke at Discogs (list of releases)

1996 albums
Collaborative albums
Albums produced by Kramer (musician)
Dogbowl albums
Kramer (musician) albums
Shimmy Disc albums